Keith William "Duke" Campbell (September 21, 1909 – July 25, 1981) was a Canadian ice hockey player who mainly played in Great Britain. Born in Stratton, Ontario, he is a member of the British Ice Hockey Hall of Fame.

Career
Campbell grew up in Winnipeg, Manitoba. Campbell played the 1928–29 season of junior hockey with the St. Vital Saints of the Winnipeg and District Junior League. In 1931–32, Campbell played senior hockey with the Winnipeg Native Sons in the Winnipeg Senior League. He then played two seasons with the Selkirk Fishermen of the Manitoba Senior League from 1932 to 1934. In the 1934–35 season, Campbell played for four teams: the independent Pittsburgh Yellow Jackets, and the Saint John Peters, Moncton Hawks and Saint John Beavers of the Maritime Senior Hockey League. In 1935, Campbell moved to England and Campbell signed with the Richmond Hawks of the English National League (ENL) for the 1935–36 season. Campbell then moved to the Harringay Greyhounds in the 1936–37 season where he stayed for four seasons, helping them to win the ENL in 1937–38 and 1938–39. Whilst with the Greyhounds, Campbell was named as a winger to the All-star A Team of the ENL in 1940.

During World War II, Campbell worked in an aircraft factory. However, he continued to play ice hockey for a Sunday league team in Brighton.

After the War, Campbell briefly joined the Brighton Tigers in the autumn of 1946 before he returned to Harringay to join the Harringay Racers for the remainder of the 1946–47 season and earning his second nomination to the All-star A Team, although this time as a defender. Campbell stayed with the Racers for four seasons, being named to the All-star B Team in 1948 and helping them to win the ENL in 1948–49.

Campbell then joined the Earls Court Rangers in 1950 as player-coach, where he stayed until he retired from ice hockey in 1953 when he was 44 years old. Whilst with the Rangers, Campbell was again named to the All-star B Team, this time as coach in 1952.

Campbell returned to Winnipeg, where he died in 1971.

Awards
Named to the ENL All-star A-Team in 1940 and 1947.
Named to the ENL All-star B-Team in 1948.
Named as coach to the ENL All-star B-Team in 1952.
Inducted as the first honoured member of the British Ice Hockey Hall of Fame in December 1948.

Career statistics

Although Campbell's career statistics are incomplete, it is known that he scored 156 goals and 255 assists for 411 points from 545 games, taking 203 penalty minutes in the process.

References
A to Z Encyclopaedia of Ice Hockey entry
British Ice Hockey Hall of Fame entry

External links

1909 births
1981 deaths
British Ice Hockey Hall of Fame inductees
Canadian ice hockey left wingers
Earls Court Rangers players
Harringay Greyhounds players
Harringay Racers players
Ice hockey people from Ontario
Moncton Hawks players
People from Rainy River District
Ice hockey people from Winnipeg
University of Manitoba alumni
Canadian expatriate ice hockey players in England